Beresheet  2 is a planned private space mission intended to land two spacecraft on the Moon in 2025. As the spacecraft reaches the Moon, it will split into three: the mothership (orbiter) and two landers that will be released for landing at different locations on the Moon. The orbiter will continue to orbit the Moon on a long-term multi-year mission. This will be the first-ever dual lander deployment mission, with the smallest landers to ever soft-land on the Moon.  The Beresheet2 Orbiter will give many students worldwide the opportunity to learn the basics of space engineering and participate in deep-space science. Through its innovative design, Beresheet2 Orbiter will serve as the first-ever – worldwide interactive space education system.
The project will include multiple educational activities for all ages and an outreach program that will connect and push these messages to the public in the partnering countries.

History 
The mission was announced by the SpaceIL voluntary association, shortly after the conclusion of the first Beresheet mission in April 2019. It was announced on 26 June 2019, that the mission will not target the Moon, and instead it will be to another undisclosed object. On 25 November 2019, it was simultaneously announced that the Moon would indeed be the target of Beresheet 2, and that SpaceIL plans to send another lander to Mars. 

On 16 January 2020, SpaceIL announced that they have officially started to work on Beresheet 2 as they were given the first million-dollar funding for the spacecraft. On 5 February 2020, Shimon Sarid was appointed as CEO of SpaceIL. In this role Sarid will lead the Beresheet 2 project. In July 2020, engineer Yoav Heichal, former chief engineer of Better Place Ltd, has joined the program as a structural engineer. The program was officially launched by Israel's former president, Reuven Rivlin, on Dec 9th, 2020 and announced that the Beresheet 2 Moon mission would launch in 2024, consisting of an orbiter and two landers. SpacelL is leading the program with the support of the Israel Space Agency.

It will have a budget of US$100 million, similar to that of Beresheet 1, and will include more international collaboration, with the United Arab Emirates as one of seven countries expressing interest.

In July 2021, the Beresheet 2 program raised 70 million dollars from a group of entrepreneur-philanthropists, Patrick & Lina Drahi family foundation, Morris Kahn and the Moshal Space Foundation. 

At World Space Week in Dubai, in October 2021, Israel and the UAE ministers of science and technology announced plans for cooperation on the mission. Said Kahn to the Global Investment Forum in Dubai, "It would be wonderful if we could develop a space program that would be a combination of Israel and the Arab world, "I would welcome it – if it fits in with the program the Emirates have. They have an ambitious program".

References 

Future spaceflights
2025 in spaceflight
Missions to the Moon
Landers (spacecraft)
Space program of Israel